Þorsteins þáttr bæjarmagns or The Story of Thorsteinn House-Power is a short legendary saga or þáttr.

It is a reworking of many of Thor's adventures, where Thorsteinn takes the place of Thor.

Editions and translations
Herman Palson and Paul Edwards translation from Seven Viking Romances at Jörmungrund.
The story in Old Norse at «Norrøne Tekster og Kvad».
The story in Old Norse at Snerpa.
The saga in English Translation with Facing Old Norse text.

External links
 Entry in the Stories for All Time project.

Legendary sagas
Þættir
Thor